Irish Exchequer may refer to:
 Exchequer of Ireland, 1210–1817
 Court of Exchequer (Ireland), c.1300–1877
 Exchequer Division of the High Court of Justice in Ireland, 1877 to 1897
 Central Fund (Ireland), since 1922